Thomas O'Donnell ( – 1945) was an Irish politician. He was elected unopposed as a Sinn Féin Teachta Dála (TD) to the 2nd Dáil at the 1921 elections for the Sligo–Mayo East constituency. He supported the Anglo-Irish Treaty and voted in favour of it. He was re-elected as a pro-Treaty Sinn Féin TD at the 1922 general election. At the 1923 general election, he stood as a Cumann na nGaedheal candidate for the Leitrim–Sligo constituency but he was not elected.

References

1945 deaths
Early Sinn Féin TDs
Cumann na nGaedheal politicians
Members of the 2nd Dáil
Members of the 3rd Dáil
Year of birth uncertain